Abacetus olivaceus is a species of ground beetle in the subfamily Pterostichinae. It was described by Tschitscherine in 1900.

References

olivaceus
Beetles described in 1900